Shannon is an American crime drama series that aired in syndication from October 16, 1961 to June 12, 1962. The series stars George Nader as the title Joe Shannon, an insurance investigator for the Transport Bonding and Surety Company. Regis Toomey portrays Shannon's boss Bill Cochran.

Guest stars

Chris Alcaide as Jack O'Hare in "Duke of the Valley"
King Calder
Francis De Sales as Ray Petri in "Cold Trail"
Robert Duvall as Joey Nolan in "The Big Fish"
Raymond Guth
DeForest Kelley as Carlyle in "The Pickup"
Ann McCrea as Phyllis Gray in "Never Help a Lady" (1962)
Joseph Mell
Lee Meriwether episode unknown
Gilman Rankin

Production notes
Jerry Briskin produced the series for Screen Gems. Gene Roddenberry wrote two of the teleplays.

Episodes

References

External links 
 
 Shannon 1961-62 at CVTA

1961 American television series debuts
1961 American television series endings
1960s American crime drama television series
Black-and-white American television shows
English-language television shows
First-run syndicated television programs in the United States
Television series by Sony Pictures Television
Television series by Screen Gems